Call Her Savage is a 1932 pre-Code drama film directed by John Francis Dillon and starring Clara Bow. The film was Bow's second-to-last film role. It is also one of the first portrayals of homosexuals on screen, including a scene in a gay bar.

Plot
A wild young woman, Nasa Springer (Clara Bow), born and raised in Texas by well-to-do parents, rebels against her father. She is sent to school in Chicago, where her disruptive behavior marks her as a troublemaker. She marries a rich playboy, who then declares the marriage a ploy and abandons her. She is renounced by her father, who tells her he never wishes to see her again. She discovers she is pregnant and bears a child. Reduced to poverty, she moves into a boardinghouse with her infant, and struggles to pay for the baby's basic needs. Unaware that her grandfather in Texas has died and left her a $100,000 fortune, a desperate Nasa dresses up as a prostitute and goes out in the neighborhood hoping to earn some quick cash to purchase medicine for her child. While she is out, a drunken lout at the boardinghouse drops a match and accidentally sets the building on fire. Nasa's infant is killed in the blaze.

Upon learning that her mother is dying, she hurries home to Texas.  There she learns that she is a "half-breed", half white and half Indian.  The assertion is made that this explains why she had always been "untameable and wild."  This knowledge of her lineage would supposedly allow her the possibility for happiness in the arms of a handsome young "half-breed" Indian named Moonglow (Gilbert Roland), a longtime friend who has secretly loved her.

Cast
 Clara Bow as Nasa Springer
 Gilbert Roland as Moonglow
 Thelma Todd as Sunny De Lane
 Monroe Owsley as Lawrence Crosby
 Estelle Taylor as Ruth Springer
 Weldon Heyburn as Ronasa
 Willard Robertson as Pete Springer
 Anthony Jowitt as Jay Randall
 Fred Kohler as Silas Jennings
 Russell Simpson as Old Man in Wagon Train
 Margaret Livingston as Molly
 Carl Stockdale as Mort
 Dorothy Peterson as Silas' Wife
 Marilyn Knowlden as Ruth (as a girl)
 Douglas Haig (uncredited) as Pete (as a boy)

Reception 
The Film Daily praised Bow's performance, writing "Looking like a million dollars, acting better than she ever did, and playing a role that requires her to pretty near run the gamut of feminine moods and modes, Clara Bow makes a whirlwind comeback."

The film attracted an audience of over 900,000 when it was showcased in 42 first-run cities.

Preservation status
The film was restored in 2012 by the Museum of Modern Art and premiered at the third annual Turner Classic Movies Film Festival in Hollywood.

References

External links
 
 
 
 

1932 drama films
1932 films
American LGBT-related films
American black-and-white films
Fox Film films
Films based on American novels
American drama films
1930s LGBT-related films
Films scored by Arthur Lange
Films directed by John Francis Dillon
1930s American films